Damn Right, I've Got the Blues is the seventh studio album by Blues guitarist Buddy Guy. The album has been described by Allmusic and Rolling Stone as a commercial comeback album for Guy after limited recording for the previous 10 years. In 2005 the album was reissued as Damn Right, I've Got The Blues Expanded Edition, featuring two bonus tracks.

Charts

Personnel 
 Buddy Guy - lead vocals & lead electric guitar
 Greg Rzab - bass guitar
 Richie Hayward - drums
 Mick Weaver - Hammond B-3 organ, piano, electric piano
 Pete Wingfield - piano
 Neil Hubbard - rhythm guitar
 John Porter - bass guitar
 Tessa Niles, Katie Kissoon, Carol Kenyon - backing vocals

Guests:
 Jeff Beck - electric guitar on 4 & 6
 Eric Clapton - electric guitar on 6
 Mark Knopfler - electric guitar on 2
 The Memphis Horns:
 Wayne Jackson - trumpet
 Andrew Love - saxophone
 Jack Hale - trombone

Mastered by George Marino at Sterling Sound, NYC

Track listing 

Expanded Edition Bonus Tracks

References 

Buddy Guy albums
Bertelsmann Music Group albums
1991 albums
Albums produced by John Porter (musician)
Grammy Award for Best Contemporary Blues Album